Domenico Centurioni (born 26 October 1940) is an Italian wrestler. He competed in the men's Greco-Roman 52 kg at the 1968 Summer Olympics.

References

External links
 

1940 births
Living people
Italian male sport wrestlers
Olympic wrestlers of Italy
Wrestlers at the 1968 Summer Olympics
Sportspeople from Rome